William H. McCardle (1815 - April 28, 1893) was a writer and editor. He was arrested by military authorities under the Reconstruction Act and appealed to the United States Supreme Court in Ex parte McCardle, but the U.S. Congress removed the court's jurisdiction. He was accused of disturbing the peace, inciting insurrection, libel, and impeding Reconstruction for publishing articles denouncing Reconstruction policies and its military commanders. He co-authored a history of Mississippi. He edited the Vicksburg Times newspaper in Vicksburg, Mississippi. The Smithsonian has a miniature watercolor on ivory depiction of him.

He married Annie E. Fort and had three children: Annie F., Battle, and Mary W. He co-authored A History of Mississippi with former Mississippi governor Robert Lowry.

References

External links
Colonel William H. McCardle, C.S.A., carte de visite by Charles D. Fredricks, ca. 1867 at the U.S. Capitol 

1815 births
1893 deaths
19th-century American male writers
19th-century American historians
Union Army colonels
Historians from Mississippi
Historians of the American Civil War
Historians of Mississippi
People of the Reconstruction Era
19th-century American journalists
Editors of Mississippi newspapers
American male journalists
Prisoners and detainees of the United States military